Buffoon is an 2022 Indian Tamil-language action crime film written and directed by Ashok Veerappan, in his directorial debut. The film stars Vaibhav, Anagha, Adukalam Naren. The film has songs and score composed by Santhosh Narayanan. The cinematography and editing were handled by Dinesh Purushothaman and Vetre Krishnan, respectively. It was produced by Karthik Subbaraj, Kaarthekeyen Santhanam, Sudhan Sundaram and Jayaram under, Stone Bench Films and Passion Studios. The film was released theatrically on 23 September 2022.

Plot synopsis
Two street theater performers (koothu artists) become pawns in a political power game and are falsely implicated in a drug smuggling case.

Cast

Music 
The film score and soundtrack album of the film is composed by Santhosh Narayanan. The music rights were acquired by Maajja.

Release

Theatrical 
The film is scheduled to be released in theaters on 23 September 2022. The teaser of the film was released on 14 March 2022. The trailer of the film was released on 14 September 2022. The distribution rights of the film in Tamil Nadu were acquired by B. Sakthivelan under the banner of Sakthi Film Factory.

Home media 
The post-theatrical streaming rights of the film are bagged by Netflix. The film will digitally stream on Netflix on 14 October.

Critical reception 
M. Suganth of The Times of India who gave 3 stars out of 5 stars after reviewing the film stated that,"Santhosh Narayanan adds to the tense nature of the scenes with his score". Avinash Ravichandran of Cinema Express who gave 2.5 stars out of 5 stars after reviewing the film stated that "Although Buffoon definitely has a lot of heart and even more potential, there is only so much that intent can do when it has to contend with lackadaisical execution bogged further down by nonchalant writing". Bharath Vijayakumar of Moviecrow rated the film 2.75 out of 5 and stated that "For now, Buffoon is a film that remains watchable". Harshini S V of Film Companion wrote that "Buffoon is not tempted to take the predictable route and does justice to its story with a convincing climax. Behindwoods rated the film 2.5 out of 5 stars and wrote "With Santhosh Narayanan's heroics, Buffoon is a watchable crime thriller." Siddharth Srinivas of Only Kollywood rated the film 3 out of 5 and stated that "On the whole, Buffoon is a convincing  drama that has both crime and thriller elements in it."

References

External links 
 Buffoon at IMDb

2022 films
2022 directorial debut films
Films scored by Santhosh Narayanan
2020s Tamil-language films